Thyrsia lateralis is a species of beetle in the family Cerambycidae. It was described by Dalman in 1819.

References

Cerambycinae
Beetles described in 1819